also known as The Spying Sorceressis a 1964 Japanese comedy jidaigeki film directed by Sadao Nakajima. Nakajima himself did the casting and Shigeru Tsuyuguchi, Kō Nishimura and Masumi Harukawa were cast from Shohei Imamura's film Unholy Desire because he was impressed with the film. It is based on Futaro Yamada's novel of the same title and 2nd in his Kunoichi film series.

Plot
The plan to overthrow the Tokugawa Shogunate, led by Yui Shōsetsu and Marubashi Chūya, failed. Matsudaira Nobutsuna sensed the movement of Yui Shōsetsu and had Hattori Hanzo search for the funding source. As a result, Matsudaira Nobutsuna learned that the billions of treasure left by the Toyotomi clan had been hidden. He sends Amakusa Senchiyo and his subordinate to Nagasaki to find the treasure.

Cast
 Shigeru Tsuyuguchi as Amakusa Senchiyo
 Kō Nishimura as Shinobu
 Masumi Harukawa as Kyara
 Shoichi Ozawa as Kyonen Mahiru 
 Takeshi Kato as Hyakusai Mizuami
 Mako Midori as Oshino
 Yuriko Mishima as Osada
Jun Tatara as Hattori Hanzo
 Gannosuke Ashiya as Kurama Izayoi

See also
Kunoichi ninpō 1st in Futaro Yamada's Kunoichi film series. Directed by Sadao Nakajima.
Ninpō-chushingura 3nd in Futaro Yamada's Kunoichi film series. Directed by Yasuto Hasegawa.

References

External links

1964 films
Films directed by Sadao Nakajima
1960s Japanese-language films
Ninja films
Samurai films
1960s Japanese films